The Man with My Face is a 1948 mystery novel by Samuel W. Taylor that was the basis for the 1951 film of the same title. It was first serialized in Liberty magazine. Taylor wrote the screenplay for the film with others, including Edward Montagne.

Notes

1948 American novels
American mystery novels
American novels adapted into films